Kasamatsu is a Japanese surname. Notable people with the surname include:

, Japanese artistic gymnast
, Japanese artistic gymnast, father of Akihiro
, Japanese artist

Japanese-language surnames